The 1967 Giro d'Italia was the 50th running of the Giro d'Italia, one of cycling's Grand Tour races. The Giro started in Treviglio, on 20 May, with a  stage and concluded in Milan, on 11 June, with a  split leg. A total of 130 riders from 13 teams entered the 22-stage race, which was won by Italian Felice Gimondi of the Salvarani team. The second and third places were taken by Italian Franco Balmamion and Frenchman Jacques Anquetil, respectively.

Teams

Thirteen teams were invited by the race organizers to participate in the 1967 edition of the Giro d'Italia. Each team sent a squad of ten riders, which meant that the race started with a peloton of 130 cyclists. From the riders that began the race, 70 made it to the finish in Milan.

The teams entering the race were:

Pre-race favorites

The starting peloton did include the 1966 winner, Gianni Motta. l'Unità writer Gino Sala named Felice Gimondi, Jacques Anquetil, Vittorio Adorni, Eddy Merckx, and Motta as the main contenders for the overall crown.

Route and stages

The race route was revealed to the public on 28 March 1967 by race director Vincenzo Torriani. The route visited all Italian regions except for Sardinia. With the route entering Sicily for the fifth time in race history, the race scaled Mount Etna for the first time.

Race overview

The sixth leg saw an overnight ferry transfer from Palermo on mainland Italy to the island of Sicily for the next two stages. Following the sixth stage's conclusion the race took a five–hour train to Catania where the upcoming stage began. With the seventh stage hosting a summit finish to Mount Etna it was hoped to be pivotal in the general classification race. However, due to the long transfers forced on the riders by organizer Torriani, the riders rode at a slow pace until the race's final three kilometers.

Classification leadership

Two jerseys were worn during the 1967 Giro d'Italia. The leader of the general classification – calculated by adding the stage finish times of each rider – wore a pink jersey. This classification is the most important of the race, and its winner is considered as the winner of the Giro.

For the points classification, which awarded a red jersey to its leader, cyclists were given points for finishing a stage in the top 15. The mountains classification leader. The climbs were ranked in first and second categories. In this ranking, points were won by reaching the summit of a climb ahead of other cyclists. Although no jersey was awarded, there was also one classification for the teams, in which the riders were awarded points for their performance on the stage and the team with the greatest total points is the leader.

Final standings

General classification

Mountains classification

Points classification

Team classification

References

Citations

1967
Giro d'Italia
Giro d'Italia
Giro d'Italia
Giro d'Italia
1967 Super Prestige Pernod